Badeleh Kuh (also Romanized as Bādeleh Kūh; also known as Bādeleh) is a village in Rudbar Rural District, in the Central District of Damghan County, Semnan Province, Iran. At the 2006 census, its population was 144, in 24 families.

References 

Populated places in Damghan County